The 1940 Washington State Cougars football team was an American football team that represented Washington State College during the 1940 college football season. Fifteenth-year head coach Babe Hollingbery led the team to a 3–4–2 mark in the Pacific Coast Conference (PCC) and 4–4–2 overall.

The Cougars played their three home games, all in October, on campus at Rogers Field in Pullman, Washington. Two road games were played nearby, in Moscow and Spokane.

Schedule

References

External links
 Game program: Montana at WSC – October 5, 1940
 Game program: Stanford at WSC – October 19, 1940
 Game program: Oregon at WSC – October 26, 1940

Washington State
Washington State Cougars football seasons
Washington State Cougars football